is a Japanese voice actress from Tokyo, Japan. She also goes by the name  when voicing adult games.

Roles

Anime
D.C. II: Da Capo II (Akane Hanasaki)
Debutante Detective Corps (Yōko Ryūzaki)
Ef: A Tale of Memories. (Chihiro Shindō)
Hanaukyo Maid Team (Yuki Morino)
Kaginado (Komari Kamikita)
Lamune (Tae Isawa)
Little Busters! (Komari Kamikita)
Maji de Watashi ni Koi Shinasai! (Tatsuko Itagaki)
Soul Link (Nanami Inatsuki)
_summer OVA (Konami Hatano)

Video games
_Summer (Konami Hatano)
Atelier Iris: Eternal Mana (Norn)
Atelier Iris 2: The Azoth of Destiny (Fee)
Atelier Iris 3: Grand Phantasm (Nell Ellis)
D.C. II: Da Capo II (Akane Hanasaki)
Ef: The First Tale. (Chihiro Shindō)
Ef: The Latter Tale. (Chihiro Shindō)
Grisaia no Kajitsu (Chizuru Tachibana)
Haru no Ashioto (Yuzuki Kaede)
Hoshiuta (Yurika Amamiya)
I/O (Ea)
Island Days (Kokoro Katsura)
Lamune (Tae Isawa)
Little Busters! (Komari Kamikita)
Logos Panic
Love & Destroy (LuLu)
Maji de Watashi ni Koi Shinasai! (Tatsuko Itagaki)
Moe! Ninja Girls RPG (Waka Kyogoku)
Narcissu: Side 2nd (Himeko)
Rapelay (Manaka Kiryū)
Riviera: The Promised Land (Fia)
Sakura Sakura (Nanako Sakura)
Strip Battle Days (Kokoro Katsura) (credited as "Izumi Maki")
Valkyrie Profile (Nanami, Lemia)
Heart de Roommate (Tomoe Katsuragi)
Tintin: Destination Adventure (Tin Tin)

Drama
Kyuukyoku Parodius (Tako A)

References

External links

1971 births
Japanese voice actresses
Living people
People from Tokyo